A list of films produced by the Marathi language film industry based in Maharashtra in the year 1984.

1984 Releases 

A list of Marathi films released in 1984.

References

Lists of 1984 films by country or language
 Marathi
1984